The Harbin Ring Expressway, designated as G1001 is an expressway in Heilongjiang, Northeast China orbiting the city of Harbin.  This expressway is a branch of G10 Suifenhe–Manzhouli Expressway.

Detailed Itinerary

{| class="wikitable" style="text-align:center" width="600px"
! text-align="center" colspan="3" |  Counterclockwise 
|- style="background:#f5f5dc;"
| colspan="3" | Continues as  G1001 Harbin Ring Expressway 
|-  style="background:#f5f5dc;"
| 0(459) ||  ||  G10 Suiman ExpresswayTowards  G301 RoadHarbin-Centre
|- style="background:#90ee90;"
|colspan="7" |  Concurrent with  G10 Suiman Expressway 
|-  style="background:#ffcbcb;"
| colspan="7" |  Service Area
|- style="background:#90ee90;"
| 6 ||  ||  G202 RoadHarbin-Centre-Pingfang
|- style="background:#90ee90;" align="center"
| 10 A-B ||  ||  G1 Jingha Expressway G102 Road

|- style="background:#90ee90;"
| 24 ||  ||  S1 Harbin Airport Expressway Harbin Taiping International AirportHarbin-Centre
|- style="background:#90ee90;"
| colspan="7" |  Yangmingtan Bridge
|- style="background:#90ee90;" align="center"
| 36 ||  || Shimao RoadHarbin-North

References

Expressways in Heilongjiang
Chinese national-level expressways
Transport in Harbin